Yago Lange (born March 22, 1988) is an Argentine sailor. He and his brother Klaus Lange placed seventh in the 49er race at the 2016 Summer Olympics. The brothers are the sons of six-time Olympic sailor Santiago Lange.

References

External links

1988 births
Living people
Argentine male sailors (sport)
Olympic sailors of Argentina
Sailors at the 2016 Summer Olympics – 49er
Pan American Games medalists in sailing
Pan American Games silver medalists for Argentina
Sailors at the 2019 Pan American Games
Medalists at the 2019 Pan American Games